Doris Elinor Day ( Philips; 3 August 1872 – 30 August 1966) was a British archer.  She competed at the 1908 Summer Olympics in London. She was born in Abbeycwmhir, Powys, Great Britain and died in East London, South Africa. Day competed at the 1908 Games in the only archery event open to women, the double National round.  She took 16th place in the event with 483 points.

Day was Welsh and her husband was a priest of the Church of England named Ernest Hermitage Day (1866 – 1946).

References

Bibliography
 
 
 Doris E. Day's profile at Sports Reference.com

1872 births
1966 deaths
Archers at the 1908 Summer Olympics
Olympic archers of Great Britain
British female archers
Welsh female archers
Sportspeople from Powys
British emigrants to South Africa